Western Oblast was an early oblast of Russian SFSR. 

Initially it was based on Vilno, Vitebsk, Mogilev, and Minsk Gubernias of the Russian Empire, capital Minsk. In April 1918, Smolensk Governorate was included and capital moved to Smolensk. In September 1918 it was renamed into Western Commune

The Western Oblast was formalized as part of the RSFSR for by the Administrative Commission of VTsIK on December 23, 1918. But very soon, on January 1, 1919, was superseded by Socialist Soviet Republic of Byelorussia.

See also
Western Oblast
Western Krai

References

1918 in Belarus
Former administrative units of Russia